Taiyū-ji (太融寺) is a Buddhist temple in Osaka Prefecture, Japan. It was founded in 821.

See also 
Thirteen Buddhist Sites of Osaka

External links 

 

Buddhist temples in Osaka
Kita-ku, Osaka
Kōyasan Shingon temples
Kūkai